Nina Barka (5 October 1908 – 1986), real name Marie Smirsky, was a prominent naive artist. She was born in Odessa, Russian Empire (now Ukraine) of Ukrainian parents, but moved to France, where she became a French citizen. Her work had many Russian(Slavic) and Byzantine themes.

References

External links
Artnet data

1908 births
1986 deaths
French women painters
Naïve painters
20th-century French women artists